Werner Henry Schnarr (March 23, 1903 — May 29, 1959) was a Canadian professional ice hockey centre who played 26 games over two seasons in the National Hockey League for the Boston Bruins between 1924 and 1926. He was born in Berlin, Ontario.

Later life
Werner H. Schnarr died from a heart attack in Guelph, Ontario, on May 31, 1959. He had been traveling in Guelph that day and his body was found in his automobile. Schnarr, an original Boston Bruin, operated a florist shop in Kitchener at the time of his death. His remains were returned for interment in his hometown. Werner was a member of a large hockey-playing family, of which only he made the NHL. In all, there were eight brothers that played the game at varying levels.

Career statistics

Regular season and playoffs

References

1903 births
1959 deaths
Boston Bruins players
Canadian ice hockey centres
Guelph Maple Leafs (ice hockey) players
Kitchener Flying Dutchmen players
Ice hockey people from Ontario
Ontario Hockey Association Senior A League (1890–1979) players
Sportspeople from Kitchener, Ontario
Stratford Nationals players